The Americana Music Honors & Awards is the marquee event for the Americana Music Association. Beginning in 2002, the Americana Music Association honors distinguished members of the music community. Six member-voted awards and several Lifetime Achievement Awards are handed out while over 2000 artists, music-loving fans and entertainment industry executives look on.

The Honors & Awards have featured a variety of musical events, including Johnny Cash and June Carter Cash's last live performance together.  Artists such as The Carolina Chocolate Drops, Robert Plant & His Band of Joy, Steve Earle & Allison Moorer, Rosanne Cash and John Fogerty have also performed for the event, and special appearances by artists like Kris Kristofferson (2003), Loretta Lynn (2004/2014), Billy Bob Thornton (2005), Bonnie Raitt (2012/2016), Dwight Yoakam (2016) and George Strait (2016) demonstrate the prestige of the genre and awards show.

The Honors & Awards show was first broadcast on national television in 2005. Also in 2005, SiriusXM, BBC2, and Voice of America began broadcasting the show on radio. PBS began airing an abbreviated version during Austin City Limits in 2011.

The Americana Honors & Awards Show returned to the historic Ryman Auditorium on September 12, 2012. It was once again hosted by Jim Lauderdale, while the All Star Band was led by Buddy Miller. The 2012 Honors & Awards show was aired live on AXS TV and later aired on Austin City Limits on PBS and replayed on AXS TV. Lauderdale stepped down from hosting duties after the 2017 ceremony and the 2018–19 Honors & Awards were hosted by The Milk Carton Kids. The show did not include a host in 2021.

Nomination process
The eligibility period for the Americana Music Association's “Of The Year” categories typically runs from April 1 through March 31 of the following year. Only active members of the Americana Music Association may participate in the Nomination and Election process. The winners are announced at the annual Americana Music Honors & Awards show.

Below is the Criteria for each of the following categories:
Album of the Year – Americana albums released during the eligibility period.
Song of the Year – Americana songs released from Albums released during the eligibility period.
Artist of the Year – An Artist who has had an exemplary year based on overall recognition and activity whether through album, song, radio airplay, publicity, touring, or other criteria within the eligibility period.
Emerging Act of the Year – Solo artist, duo, or group having an exemplary year and first blush of national public awareness through overall recognition and activity, whether through album, song, radio airplay, sales, publicity, touring, or other criteria  during eligibility period who has not previously been nominated in any category.
Duo/Group of the Year – Duo/Group – have had an exemplary year based on overall recognition and activity, whether through album, song, radio airplay, publicity, touring, or other criteria within the eligibility period.
Instrumentalist of the Year :  An award given to a collaborative musician having an exemplary year within the eligibility period based on overall recognition and activity, whether through work on an album, song, touring, or other criteria.

Competitive awards
All awards history information is also available on the Americana Music Association's website.

Album of the Year

Song of the Year

Artist of the Year

Duo/Group of the Year

Instrumentalist of the Year

Emerging Act of the Year

Lifetime Achievement Awards

Americana Trailblazer Award

First Amendment Center and Americana Music Association "Spirit of Americana" Free Speech Award/Inspiration Award

Jack Emerson Lifetime Achievement Award for Executive

Lifetime Achievement Award for Instrumentalist

Lifetime Achievement Award for Performance

Lifetime Achievement Award for Producer/Engineer

Lifetime Achievement Award for Songwriting

National Museum of African American Music/Americana Music Association Legacy of Americana Award

President's Award

WagonMaster/Lifetime Achievement Award

UK Americana Music Association Awards
The inaugural UK AMA awards were presented by the UK Americana Music Association were held at St John at Hackney in London on 3 February 2016 and was hosted by Bob Harris and Ethan Johns. The second annual UK Americana awards were held on 2 February 2017 and the third awards were held on 1 February 2018. The fifth awards were held on 30 January 2020. The 2021 ceremony was held virtually on 29 January due to the COVID-19 pandemic. The 2022 ceremony was held at the Hackney Empire and was hosted by Harris and Baylen Leonard on 26 January 2023.

UK Album of the Year
2023 – Superhuman by Ferris & Sylvester
2022 – Stand for Myself by Yola (produced by Dan Auerbach)
2021 – In This Town You're Owned by Robert Vincent 
2020 – Walk Through Fire by Yola (produced by Dan Auerbach)
2019 – Shorebound by Ben Glover
2018 – I'll Make The Most of My Sins by Robert Vincent 
2017 – Ghost by Lewis & Leigh (produced by Matt Ingram)
2016 – What Kind of Love by Danny and the Champions of the World (produced by Chris Clarke and Danny George Wilson)

International Album of the Year
2023 – Raise the Roof by Robert Plant and Alison Krauss (produced by T Bone Burnett)
2022 – Outside Child by Allison Russell (produced by Dan Knobler)
2021 – Old Flowers by Courtney Marie Andrews (produced by Andrew Sarlo)
2020 – The Highwomen by The Highwomen (produced by Dave Cobb)
2019 – May Your Kindness Remain by Courtney Marie Andrews
2018 – The Nashville Sound by Jason Isbell and the 400 Unit (produced by Dave Cobb)
2017 – Angeleno by Sam Outlaw (produced by Ry Cooder and Joachim Cooder)
2016 – Blackbirds by Gretchen Peters (produced by Doug Lancio, Barry Walsh and Gretchen Peters)

UK Artist of the Year
2023 – Elles Bailey
2022 – Yola
2021 – Robert Vincent 
2020 – Yola
2019 – Bennett Wilson Poole
2018 – Emily Barker
2017 – Yola
2016 – Danny and the Champions of the World

International Artist of the Year
2023 – Allison Russell
2022 – Allison Russell
2021 – Courtney Marie Andrews
2020 – Brandi Carlile
2019 – Mary Gauthier
2018 – Courtney Marie Andrews
2017 – Sturgill Simpson
2016 – Jason Isbell

UK Song of the Year
2022 – "Willing" by Lady Nade
2021 – "I Don't Wanna Lie" by Yola, Dan Auerbach and Bobby Wood
2020 – "Little Piece of Heaven" by Elles Bailey, Bobby Wood and Dan Auerbach
2019 – "Southern Wind" by Dean Owens
2018 – "Home" by Yola Carter
2017 – "The 4:19" by Al Lewis and Alva Leigh (Lewis & Leigh)
2016 – "Clear Water" by Danny George Wilson and Paul Lush (Danny and the Champions of the World)

International Song of the Year
2023 – "You Are Not Alone" by Allison Russell featuring Brandi Carlile
2022 – "Right on Time" by Brandi Carlile
2021 – Hand Over My Heart by The Secret Sisters
2020 – "Me and the Ghost of Charlemagne" by Amy Speace
2019 – "The Joke" by Brandi Carlile
2018 – "Tenderheart" by Sam Outlaw
2017 – "Hands of Time" by Margo Price
2016 – "Blackbirds" by Gretchen Peters and Ben Glover (Gretchen Peters)

Bob Harris Emerging Artist of the Year
2023 – The Hanging Stars
2022 – Lauren Housley
2021 – Robbie Cavanaugh and Demi Marriner
2020 – Ferris & Sylvester
2019 – Curse of Lono
2018 – The Wandering Hearts
2017 – Wildwood Kin
2016 – Robert Vincent

UK Instrumentalist of the Year
2023 – Holly Carter (steel guitar)
2022 – Michelle Stodart (guitar)
2021 – Anna Corcoran (piano)
2020 – Siân Monaghan (drums)
2019 – CJ Hillman (multiple instruments)
2018 – Thomas Collison (multiple instruments)
2017 – CJ Hillman (multiple instruments)
2016 – B. J. Cole (steel guitar)

AMA Trailblazer
2023 – Nickel Creek
2022 – Beth Orton and The Long Ryders
2021 – Christine McVie and Steve Earle
2020 – Nick Lowe
2018 – Mumford & Sons
2017 – Albert Lee
2016 – Billy Bragg

AMA Lifetime Achievement Award
2023 – Mike Scott and Judy Collins
2022 – Lucinda Williams
2021 – Elvis Costello and Mavis Staples
2020 – Joan Armatrading
2019 – Graham Nash
2018 – Robert Plant
2017 – Richard Thompson

Songwriters Legacy Award
2023 – Loretta Lynn
2021 – John Prine

Best Selling Americana Album
2023 – FTHC by Holly Carter
2022 – Greenfields by Barry Gibb
2021 – Song for Our Daughter by Laura Marling
2020 – Jade Bird by Jade Bird
2019 – Be More Kind by Frank Turner
2018 – Carry Fire by Robert Plant
2017 – Roll with the Punches by Van Morrison
2016 – Stay Gold by First Aid Kit

Australian Americana Music Association Honours
The inaugural annual Australian American Music Honours Night, a celebration of Australian roots music, was held on October 2, 2017. The ceremony, which was televised on the Country Music Channel in early 2018, featured performances from many of Australia's top roots performers alongside Valerie June and Old Crow Medicine Show who acted as "US Americana Ambassadors". The inaugural ceremony also featured the presentation of two honours. The second event was held on October 11, 2018, and featured Margo Price and Joshua Hedley as Americana Ambassadors.

Vanguard Award
2017: Kasey Chambers
2017: Brian Taranto
2018: Shane Howard
2018: Brian Wise

See also
 Americana (music)
 Americana Music Association
 Americana Music Festival & Conference

References

External links
 Americana Music Association website
 Americana Radio Chart

American music awards
Lifetime achievement awards
Americana music

Awards established in 2002
2002 establishments in the United States